The British-Swiss Chamber of Commerce (BSCC) is an independent not-for-profit organisation  founded in 1920  with more than 500 members. It aims to improve business relations between Switzerland, Liechtenstein and the UK. The BSCC is a forum for debate and networking.The BSCC is composed of corporate, SME and individual members, who are categorized into four groups, called network, promote, lead, and influence. BSCC members represent the majority of business sectors. 

The BSCC is also divided into geographical chapters. These are active in Basel, Berne, Central Switzerland, Geneva, Liechtenstein, Ticino, the UK, and Zurich. The BSCC has special interest groups covering public affairs, legal and tax. The BSCC also provides training, workshops and panel discussions.

Organisation 
An elected president and a secretary-general head up the organisation. 

The BSCC team is made up of more than 100 people in Switzerland and the UK, of whom the major are volunteers. Most are representatives of member companies and are active in the chamber's various parts: 

 councillors review the executive operations and constitute the governing body of the BSCC
 the executive board oversees operational matters and drives BSCC strategy
 chapter committee members act as local brand ambassadors and provide ideas for events
 the public affairs commission identifies political and economic issues of bilateral interest
 a European task force provides insight on relevant trends and developments.

The president in 2022 was Dame Inga Beale, a former chief executive of Lloyd's of London.  

The BSCC is one of the 40 members of the Council of British Chambers of Commerce in Europe (COBCOE), which represents British chambers of commerce in 37 countries.

External links 
 The British-Swiss Chamber of Commerce
 Council of British Chambers of Commerce in Continental Europe (COBCOE)

References 

Chambers of commerce
Organizations established in 1920